Gennadota is a genus of rove beetles in the family Staphylinidae. There are at least two described species in Gennadota.

Species
These two species belong to the genus Gennadota:
 Gennadota canadensis Casey, 1906
 Gennadota puberula (Casey, 1893)

References

Further reading

External links

 

Aleocharinae
Articles created by Qbugbot